MotorStorm: RC is a 2012 racing video game by Evolution Studios and published by Sony Computer Entertainment for the PlayStation 3 and PlayStation Vita computer entertainment systems. The fifth and most recent game in the MotorStorm series.

The game features 8 styles of vehicles, 4 returning areas from previous MotorStorm games, and has 16 tracks built out of them. The Pro-Am Expansion and the Carnival Expansion DLC, both released in 2012, add new tracks and vehicles to the game. The game features split screen multiplayer, cross-saving and a single purchase for both versions of the game.

Reception 

MotorStorm: RC received "generally favorable" reviews, according to review aggregator Metacritic.

Eurogamer gave the game an 8 out of 10, praising its use of instantaneous restarts, minimal loading times, fast pacing, and a dubstep soundtrack in order to create an engaging gameplay loop. GamesRadar similarly commended the fast-paced gameplay, cross-platform support, and pop-up challenge notices while lamenting the lack of online multiplayer, substantial car customization, and power-ups. IGN called the title "refreshingly simple" while lauding its sharp handling model, live leaderboards, and amount of content. Pocket Gamer said that MotorStorm: RC was "...an extremely forward-thinking game in terms of simplicity of play, online connectivity, and pricing. Push Square stated that the title was "utterly essential" and said that it served as "...a successful test bed for one of the PlayStation Vita's most promising features", while saying that the social functions "...[brought] longevity to the package despite its meager price point." VideoGamer.com praised the addictive gameplay and deep handling model but found the game to be visually a bit rough on the Vita.

References

External links
 

2012 video games
MotorStorm
Pack-in video games
PlayStation 3 games
PlayStation Network games
PlayStation Vita games
Radio-controlled car racing video games
Sony Interactive Entertainment games
Video games developed in the United Kingdom
Video games using Havok
Multiplayer and single-player video games
Evolution Studios games